Bradypophila is a genus of snout moths. It was described by R. v. Ihering in 1914, and contains the species Bradypophila garbei. It is found in Brazil.

The forewings are unicolorous dark ochreous.

The larvae are associated with tree sloths.

References

Chrysauginae
Monotypic moth genera
Moths of South America
Pyralidae genera
Coprophagous insects